The  Miss Michigan USA competition is the pageant that selects the representative for the state of Michigan in the Miss USA pageant. It is currently directed by Proctor Productions.

Their first Miss USA victory was in 1990, and notable because Carole Gist was the first African-American to win the title. Following in her footsteps, Kenya Moore, also African-American, won the title in 1993. In 2010, Michigan's Rima Fakih became the first Arab-American to win the title. The most recent placement was Elizabeth Johnson in 2018, placed in top 15.

Until 2012, no Michigan delegate had been previously competed at either Miss Michigan or Miss Michigan Teen USA to appear a crossover with Miss USA. Kristen Danyal became the first Michigan delegate to have a Teen to Miss crossover in Miss USA.

Aria Hutchinson of Plymouth was crowned Miss Michigan USA 2022 on May 28, 2022, at McMorran Place Sports & Entertainment Center in Port Huron. She represented Michigan for the title of Miss USA 2022.

Gallery of titleholders

Results summary

Placements in Miss USA
Miss USAs: Carole Gist (1990), Kenya Moore (1993), Rima Fakih (2010)
1st runner-up: Kevin Gale (1976)
3rd runner-up: Elisa Schleef (2003)
Top 6: Natasha Bell (1996)
Top 10/11/12: Judy Hatula (1952), Pat Glannon (1971), Marilyn Ann Petty (1972), Diane Arabia (1982), Kimberly Mexicotte (1983),  Johnelle Ryan (1998), Shannon Grace Clark (1999), Jill Dobson (2000), Kenya Howard (2001), Rashontae Wawrzyniak (2015)
Top 15/16: Barbara Sias (1956), Judith Richards (1960), Patricia Lyn Squires (1961), Pamela Lee Sands (1963), Susan Pill (1965), Virginia Clift (1968), Crystal Hayes (2005), Kelly Best (2007), Kristen Danyal (2012), Elizabeth Johnson (2018)

Michigan holds a record of 26 placements at Miss USA.

Awards
Miss Congeniality: Taylor Hale (2021)

Winners
Color key

1 Age at the time of the Miss USA pageant

References

External links
Official website
Past Titleholders at Official Website

Michigan
Michigan culture
Women in Michigan
Recurring events established in 1952
Annual events in Michigan
1952 establishments in Michigan